Daniel "Dani" Raba Antolín (born 29 October 1995) is a Spanish professional footballer who plays as a right winger for CD Leganés.

Club career

Villarreal
Born in Santander, Cantabria, Raba joined Villarreal CF in July 2014 at the age of 19, from Club Bansander. He was immediately assigned to the C team, and made his senior debut on 30 August of that year by coming on as a substitute for Mario González and scoring his team's only in a 1–3 home loss against CD Castellón in the Tercera División.

On 3 January 2016, Raba first appeared with the reserves by replacing Alfonso Pedraza in a 2–2 Segunda División B home draw with RCD Espanyol B. Definitely promoted to the B side ahead of the 2016–17 campaign, he scored his first goal for them on 28 August in a 1–1 home draw against CF Gavà, and renewed his contract on 4 June 2017.

Raba made his first-team debut on 25 October 2017, replacing fellow youth graduate Leo Suárez in a 1–0 loss at SD Ponferradina in the round of 32 of the Copa del Rey. His first match in La Liga took place on 5 November, when he came in for Carlos Bacca late into a 2–0 home win over Málaga CF.

On 23 November 2017, Raba scored his first professional goal, his team's first in a 3–2 victory against FC Astana in the group stage of the UEFA Europa League. His first in the league arrived ten days later, but in a 3–1 away defeat to CD Leganés.

On 5 August 2019, Raba joined recently relegated club SD Huesca on a season-long loan deal. He returned to Villarreal in July 2020, but featured rarely until terminating his contract on 31 January 2022.

Granada
On 2 February 2022, Raba signed a short-term contract with Granada CF. He totalled only 24 minutes during his spell, also being relegated from the top flight.

Leganés
On 24 June 2022, Raba agreed to a two-year deal at CD Leganés in the Segunda División.

Personal life
Raba's younger brother, Pablo, is also a footballer. A defender, he was developed at Racing de Santander.

Career statistics

Club

Honours
Villarreal
UEFA Europa League: 2020–21

Huesca
Segunda División: 2019–20

References

External links

1995 births
Living people
Spanish footballers
Footballers from Santander, Spain
Association football wingers
La Liga players
Segunda División players
Segunda División B players
Tercera División players
Villarreal CF C players
Villarreal CF B players
Villarreal CF players
SD Huesca footballers
Granada CF footballers
CD Leganés players
UEFA Europa League winning players